"Counting the Beat" is a single by New Zealand rock band The Swingers released in 1981 from their album Practical Jokers (released in the US as Counting the Beat).

History
The single was performed by The Swingers; the group's frontman Phil Judd was previously a member of Split Enz. Although the band had several hit songs in New Zealand, "Counting the Beat" was their only major chart success in Australia, and they are considered a one-hit wonder in that country. The song is well known for its catchy beat and memorable music video.

There were long delays in the release of the song: while recorded in August 1980, the final mix was not ready until November, and the decision then made by Mushroom to not release the song until after Christmas. Between its recording and release, Buster Stiggs had left the band and joined Australian rock group Models.

On its eventual release in February, the song was an immediate hit, reaching #1 in Australia on 2 March 1981 and in New Zealand that May (where it spent 9 weeks in the top two). The song was the number one charting song of 1981 in Australia according to the Kent Music Report end of year chart. As of July 1997 it had sold over 100,000 copies in Australia.

Track listing
 Counting the Beat
 One Good Reason

Music video
The song is known for its memorable music video as well as the song. The crowd at the end of the song were not actors but instead people on a 'surprise' drinking bus. One of the stops was the video shoot, where they had 15 minutes to dance.

Silver Scroll award
In September 2015, 'Counting the Beat' was awarded a retrospective New Zealand Silver Scroll award, dubbed the 'lost Silver Scroll', because the awards were not held in 1981, for reasons that remain unclear.

Charts

Weekly charts

Year-end charts

Popular culture
In the early- to mid-1990s, the title of the song was also the name of a New Zealand music show, broadcast on (mostly independent) radio stations across New Zealand.
From the early- to mid-1990s until the early 2000s, the song was used as the theme for the New Zealand soft drink Lemon and Paeroa.
 Gordon Spittle authored the book Counting The Beat, GP Publications, 1997. 
From 1997 to 2002, the song was used in advertisements for Kmart Australia.
In 2001, it was voted fourth best New Zealand song of all time by members of APRA, and included on the related Nature's Best CD and DVD.
It was included on an episode of the Australian TV series 20 to 1, covering "one-hit wonders". "Counting the Beat" was ranked number 13 and was identified as Australian in origin. As The Swingers were signed with Australian label Mushroom Records and were resident in Australia at the time, the song is sometimes seen as an Australian song.
In 2011, MediaWorks New Zealand–owned television channel TV3 used the song in some programme advertisements, Since 6 February 2011 the song is now used as their official theme song.
Countdown, a New Zealand supermarket, used the song in its advertising from 2014 until 2018.

References

External links
The Swingers: "Counting the Beat"
"20 to 1" with Bert Newton: One Hit Wonders (aired 13 Feb 2006) 
Music video for "Counting the Beat", NZ On Screen
Lemon and Paeroa World Famous in NZ ad
Musical analysis of 'Counting the Beat' on AudioCulture

1981 singles
APRA Award winners
Number-one singles in Australia
The Swingers songs
Number-one singles in New Zealand
Songs written by Phil Judd
1980 songs
Mushroom Records singles